"Candidatus Scalindua brodae" is a bacterial member of the order Planctomycetales and therefore lacks peptidoglycan in its cell wall, has a compartmentalized cytoplasm. It is an ammonium oxidising bacteria.

See also
Scalindua wagneri

References 

Environmental microbiology
Planctomycetota
Bacteria described in 2003
Candidatus taxa